In Love With These Times is a compilation of previously released songs by artists on New Zealand based Flying Nun Records. It was released by Flying Nun in 1990 and re-released in a 2CD package with the 1991 compilation Pink Flying Saucers Over the Southern Alps. The CD version released by Flying Nun Europe contained an additional six tracks which were omitted from the re-release.

Track listing
 "Rain" - The Chills
 "She Speeds" - Straitjacket Fits
 "Cactus Cat" - Look Blue Go Purple
 "Flex" - Jean-Paul Sartre Experience
 "North By North" - The Bats
 "Trouble With Kay" - Sneaky Feelings
 "Slow Sad Love Song" - Verlaines
 "Grader Spader" - Bailter Space
 "Donka" - Headless Chickens
 "What Was That Thing?" - Able Tasmans
 "A.F.F.C.O." - The Skeptics
 "Hang On" - Snapper
 "The Slide" - Tall Dwarfs
 
Additional tracks on Flying Nun Europe CD edition
 "Barlow's House" - Dead Famous People
 "The Boy With the Sad Hands" - Jay Clarkson
 "Jaffa Boy" - Bird Nest Roys
 "Mothlight" - The Terminals
 "Immigration Song" - This Kind of Punishment
 "The Wheel" - The Dead C

References
 Flying Nun re-release announcement
TV Commercial for "In Love with These Times" (1989) by Brilliant Films.

Compilation albums by New Zealand artists
Dunedin Sound albums
1990 compilation albums
Rock compilation albums
Flying Nun Records compilation albums